Stevenson Place is a 24-story,  Class-A office building located at 71 Stevenson Street in the Financial District of San Francisco, California. Construction of the building began in 1985 and was completed in 1987 and was designed by the architecture firm Kaplan Mclaughlin Diaz. The building was the winner of the 1987 Prestressed Concrete Institute Competition.

Tenants
 H5 (former tenant)
 Lending Club
 Bare Escentuals (Shiseido subsidiary)

See also

 List of tallest buildings in San Francisco

References

Financial District, San Francisco
Skyscraper office buildings in San Francisco
Office buildings completed in 1987
Kaplan McLaughlin Diaz buildings
1987 establishments in California